Kissimmee River Railway was an American single-track standard gauge steam rail line in Polk County, Florida stretching 7.26 miles from Walinwa to Nalaca, an area that developed with logging, sawmill, and turpentine industries. The rail line extended from the Seaboard Airline Railway branch line connecting Plant City and Walinwa. It also served the logging and mill town of Sumica and the turpentine settlement of Nalaka, Florida. Kissimmee River Railway was incorporated December 3, 1917. It was operated by the United States Railroad Administration.

References

Defunct Florida railroads